William Robert Moon (7 June 1868 – 9 January 1943) was an English association football goalkeeper and a member of the England national football team. He also played first-class cricket with Middlesex. His brother Leonard Moon was a Test cricketer.

Moon debuted for England in a win over Wales in 1888 and same year kept a clean sheet against Scotland. His record as being the youngest goalkeeper for England remained until August 2012 when this was taken by Jack Butland of Birmingham City who was 64 days his junior. Up until 1891 he appeared in three further internationals against Wales and was capped twice against Scotland. He captained his country for the last of his seven internationals, when England took on Scotland at Ewood Park. When not playing for England he occupied the goals for both Old Westminsters and the Corinthians.

A solicitor by profession, Moon was also a capable cricketer and played as a hard hitting wicket-keeper batsman. He kept wicket for Middlesex in two first-class cricket matches during the 1891 County Championship. He made 17 not out on debut against Surrey in what would be his only first-class innings as Moon's second match was washed out after a day.

References

External links

1868 births
1943 deaths
English footballers
England international footballers
Association football goalkeepers
Corinthian F.C. players
English cricketers
Middlesex cricketers
People from Maida Vale
Footballers from the City of Westminster
Cricketers from Greater London
Old Westminsters F.C. players
Wicket-keepers